T. Abdul Rahman (1934 – 15 December 2002), also known as Olympian Rahman, was an Indian Olympic footballer from Kozhikode, Kerala. His playing position was defender. Rahman was a member of the Indian team that reached the semi-final in 1956 Melbourne Olympics.

Career
Rahman was born in Kozhikode. He began his club career in the early 1950s by playing for local clubs in Calicut. He went on to play for many leading football clubs in India including Rajasthan Club and Mohun Bagan Club of Kolkata. He spearheaded the Mohun Bagan defense during the 1950s and the 1960s and was the captain of the Kolkata club.

Career

As a child, Rahaman was always fascinated with football and stopped his studies as early as the 4th grade to fulfill his dreams of becoming a footballer. He was selected in the team of Independence Sports club, Kozhikode and later joined the Universal Club. He became the star of Malabar football during that period.

In 1954, he represented the Malabar team which reached the semi-finals of the Rovers Cup in 1954.

19-year-old Rahaman marked his debut for the country against Russia in 1955 at Thiruvananthapuram. The call up to Team India was yet again rewarded with a transfer to the erstwhile Rajasthan Club and he also went on to play for Mohun Bagan in 1959. Rahman spearheaded the Bagan defence during the early 60s and also captained the Kolkata giants.

Rahaman represented Bengal in the Santosh Trophy National Football Championship 9 times between 1955 and 1966. He helped the team win 4 titles during this span. He also captained Bangalore to win Santosh Trophy in 1962.

The Indian football team which represented the country in the 1956 Melbourne Olympics also featured Rahaman. The team reached the semi finals and even beat the hosts 4-2 en route to the semi-finals. Rahaman was forced to miss the next Olympics at Rome in 1960 due to an injury.

Rahaman retired from the game on 10 November 1967. In the later stages of his life, he coached the giants of football like Mohammedan Sporting, Premier Tyres and Travancore Titanium. He died on 15 December 2002 at the age of 69.

Olympian Rahman Memorial Academy of Football
Rahman died on 15 December 2002 in Calicut at the age of 68. After his death the football lovers of Kozhikode asked for the establishment of a sports academy in his honour. In 2005 the Kozhikode District Football Association (KDFA) duly created the academy. The aim of the Olympian Rehman Memorial Academy of Football is to promote young talent in Kerala especially in the Malabar region. Mathrubhumi news daily published his playing memories in their Sunday supplement namely "Memories in playgrounds" i.e.കളിക്കളത്തിലെ ഓർമ്മകൾ".

Honours

India
Merdeka Tournament runner-up: 1959

References

External links
 

Indian footballers
Indian Muslims
Olympic footballers of India
Footballers at the 1956 Summer Olympics
India international footballers
Malayali people
1934 births
2002 deaths
Footballers from Kerala
People from Kozhikode district
Association football defenders
Mohun Bagan AC players
Calcutta Football League players